Datang, also known as Datangpu, is a town in Pujiang County, Chengdu, Sichuan. It has good transport links and major routes between Datang, Chengdu and Chengdu Shuangliu International Airport and it is situated in one of the most environmentally friendly and pollution-free areas of Chengdu. Hongfu Village is the head village and a major tourist attraction of Datang Town. The town economically relies on the exportation and trade of rice.

External links 

Datang Telecom
Map of Datang Town
Travel China Guide

Pujiang County, Sichuan
Towns in Sichuan